The RN-5 (Autopista Comalapa, Boulevard Los Proceres) serves as one of the main highways in the Metropolitan Area of San Salvador. The highway connects the metropolitan area with the El Salvador International Airport, located in San Luis Talpa, La Paz, a municipality that borders with the San Salvador Department. The highway was built to replace the old Carretera al Aeropuerto, a small road that runs on the side of a mountain range, parallel to the Autopista Comalapa. This road has been turned into a scenic road. It overlooks the new RN-5 and the southern hills of the San Salvador Department. It is currently the only highway that connects to the airport coming from the metropolitan area. Other highways connect with the RN-5 to provide connection to the other departments in the country. The construction of the first Carretera a Comalapa was made in 1980. The construction of the highway began in 2001 and it was completed and inaugurated on November 22, 2002. The part of the highway known as Boulevard de Los Proceres runs through the southern side of the city of San Salvador. The highway is also a vital area in the city. It connects with various restaurants, business centers, and other dealerships.

History
 
The first RN-5 is now a scenic parkway, that runs parallel to the current highway. It was built in the 1980s to connect the metropolitan area with the southern municipalities and with the new El Salvador International Airport. The El Salvador airport is the only one in Central America that was built outside any urban area in order to have flat land for runway construction and enough space for future expansion without disturbing urban life.

Reconstruction

Francisco Flores, the president of El Salvador, inaugurated the remodeled RN-5 (Autopista Comalapa) that stretches from the Metropolitan Area of San Salvador all the way down to the EL Salvador International Airport in San Luis Talpa.

The cost of reconstruction of the RN-5 was US$25,000,000. The project will benefit the lives of about 700,000 people living in the surrounding areas, plus everyone in the metropolitan area that uses the International Airport. About  of the RN-5 has a total of six lanes, (three lanes in each direction). As it exits the urban area, the highway has four lanes (two in each direction).

Today
Today the highway is carries 100,000 vehicles per week. It is the main artery that connects the metropolitan area with the airport, and with the CA-2, the highway that runs on the Salvadoran Coast.

Junctions and Exits

References

San Salvador
Highways in El Salvador